Borajna (Cyrillic: Борајна) is a village in Bosnia and Herzegovina. According to the 1991 census, the village is located in the municipality of Grude.

Demographics 
According to the 2013 census, its population was 211.

References

Populated places in Grude